Herbert Seeberger (born 14 July 1949 in Erlangen) is a German sport shooter. He competed at the 1988 Summer Olympics in the mixed skeet event, in which he placed tenth.

References

1949 births
Living people
Skeet shooters
German male sport shooters
Shooters at the 1988 Summer Olympics
Olympic shooters of West Germany
Sportspeople from Erlangen
20th-century German people